Prospect is a rural locality in the Shire of Banana, Queensland, Australia.

Geography
Prospect Creek is a neighbourhood.

History 
Torsdale Farm Provisional School opened on 16 July 1919 as a half-time provisional school in conjunction with Torsdale Station Provisional School (meaning they shared a single teacher). Both schools closed on 31 December 1920 due to low student numbers.

Kooingal State School opened on 4 June 1931. It closed on 8 July 1956. It was at 1382 Crowsdale Camboon Road.

On 2 October 1935, Torsdale Farm Provisional School reopened. In 1944, approval was given for the establishment of a Prospect Creek State School to replace the provisional school at Torsdale Farm on the same site. Prospect Creek State School opened on 5 June 1944.

The mobile library service commenced in 2004.

In the  Prospect had a population of 297 people.

Education
Prospect Creek State School is a government primary (Prep-6) school for boys and girls at 12935 Dawson Highway. In 2018, the school had an enrolment of 42 students with 4 teachers (3 full-time equivalent) and 6 non-teaching staff (3 full-time equivalent).

There are no secondary schools in Prospect. The nearest government secondary school is Biloela State High School in neighbouring Biloela to the north-east.

Amenities
Banana Shire Council provides a fortnightly mobile library service at Prospect Creek School.

References

Shire of Banana
Localities in Queensland